Bellepoint is an unincorporated community in Delaware County, in the U.S. state of Ohio.

History
Bellepoint was laid out in 1835. According to tradition, the community was named for the fact the town site is located on a point shaped like a bell. A post office called Belle Point was established in 1837; the name was changed to Bellpoint in 1893, and the post office closed in 1907.

References

Unincorporated communities in Delaware County, Ohio
Unincorporated communities in Ohio
Populated places established in 1835
1835 establishments in Ohio